Ōita at-large district is a constituency in the House of Councillors of Japan, the upper house of the Diet of Japan (national legislature). It currently elects 2 members to the House of Councillors, 1 per election. The current representatives are:

 Kiyoshi Adachi, first elected in 2019. Term ends in 2025. Listed as an Independent.
 Shin'ya Adachi, first elected in 2004. Term ends in 2022. Member of the Democratic Party For the People.

The district has an electorate of 963,323 as of May 2021.

Elected members of House of Councillors 

OFF - Oita Farrmers Federation ASTNS - Association To Send a New Style to National Politics  †: Died in Office

References 

Districts of the House of Councillors (Japan)